The Approach and Landing Tests were a series of sixteen 1977 taxi and flight trials of the prototype Space Shuttle Enterprise to test the vehicle's flight characteristics, eleven while mated to the Shuttle Carrier Aircraft and five in crewed free flight. 

The Space Shuttle program began spaceflight missions in April 1981.

Background

The Space Shuttle program originated in the late 1960s as an attempt to reduce the cost of spaceflight by introducing a reusable spacecraft. The final agreed design would feature a reusable spaceplane, a disposable external tank and reusable solid-fuel rocket boosters. The contract to build the spaceplane, which eventually came to be known as the "orbiter", was awarded to North American Rockwell (later Rockwell International), with the first complete orbiter rolled out in 1976. Originally planned to be named Constitution (due to its completion being in the year of the United States Bicentennial), a letter-writing campaign by Star Trek fans persuaded President Gerald Ford to change the name of the prototype to Enterprise. It was unveiled to the public on September 17, 1976, with several members of the Star Trek cast in attendance.

Test program
Upon the orbiter's entry into service, NASA began an extensive program of tests using Enterprise to ensure all of the systems it had put in place for the Shuttle program functioned as designed. These tests would encompass not only the flight tests planned to test the flight characteristics of the orbiter, but also ground-based testing of the launch pad systems and procedures. In January 1977, Enterprise was taken by road from the Rockwell plant at Palmdale, California to the Dryden Flight Research Center at Edwards Air Force Base to begin the flight test phase of the program, which had been christened by NASA as the Approach and Landing Tests (ALT).

Crews

The program lasted from February until October 1977, with a pair of two-man crews assigned to the orbiter:

Crew 1

Haise had previously flown as the Lunar Module pilot of Apollo 13, and was named as the commander of the original STS-2 mission. Fullerton later flew as the pilot of STS-3 and commanded STS-51-F.

Crew 2

This crew later flew on STS-2. Engle was originally a USAF pilot on the X-15, and had already gained Astronaut wings by the time he joined NASA. He flew his second Shuttle mission on STS-51-I. Truly flew his second Shuttle mission as commander of STS-8.

Shuttle carrier aircraft
In addition to the two assigned Shuttle crews, who would alternate crewing the orbiter, a single flight crew was attached to the Boeing 747 Shuttle Carrier Aircraft (SCA) for the entire program:

ALT
The ALT program was divided into three distinct phases. The first phase was designated as the "taxi-test" phase, which involved the SCA and orbiter in a mated formation conducting taxi tests at Edwards Air Force Base to verify the taxiing characteristics of the aircraft while carrying the orbiter. These tests did not involve the orbiter in any way beyond it being mated to the aircraft, so consequently it remained powered down and uncrewed. A total of three taxi-tests were performed on February 15, 1977. Following this, the program moved into its next phase.

Captive flights

The captive flight phase of ALT saw the SCA/orbiter combination in flight as a test of the SCA's flying characteristics while mated to the orbiter, and as an initial test of the orbiter systems in flight. This was subdivided into two phases:

Captive – inert
There were a total of five captive-inert flights designed to test the flight and handling characteristics of the aircraft while it was mated to the orbiter. As with the taxi tests, this did not involve the orbiter beyond it being mated to the SCA, so it remained unpowered and uncrewed.

Captive – active
The captive-active flights were intended to determine the optimum profile required for Enterprise to separate from the SCA during the orbiter's free-flights. These were also intended to refine and test the orbiter crew procedures and to ensure the operational readiness of the orbiter's systems. For these three flights, although Enterprise remained mated to the SCA, it was powered and crewed.

Free-flight

The final phase of flight testing involved free-flights. These saw Enterprise mated to the SCA and carried to a launch altitude, before being released to glide to a landing on the runways at Edwards AFB. The intention of these flights was to test the flight characteristics of the orbiter itself, on a typical approach and landing profile from orbit.

For the approach and landing tests, a nose strut longer than those employed in later ferry flights increased the shuttle's angle of attack relative to the 747. Prior to the orbiter being released, the 747 engines were set to full power and the paired aircraft entered a shallow dive. Increased air speed combined with the shuttle's higher angle of attack generated enough differential lift so that the shuttle was effectively supporting the 747. Load cells on the three attachment points monitored the forces, informing the crew when the attachments were in sufficient tension. The mechanical connection between the two aircraft was then severed by the use of explosive bolts and the shuttle essentially dropped the 747. The shuttle crew reported feeling an upward lurch on separation. The two aircraft then turned in opposite directions to maximize separation. The shuttle executed some more turns to evaluate its handling and glided to a landing.

There were a total of five free-flights between August and October; the first three saw Enterprise remain fitted with its aerodynamic tail cone, intended to reduce drag when mounted on the SCA during flight. The final two had the tail cone removed, with the orbiter in its full operational configuration, with dummy main engines and OMS pods. Enterprise used an air data probe mounted on its nose for these flights. These five flights were to be the only time Enterprise flew alone.

After flying missions on Columbia (STS-2) and Discovery (STS-51-I), Engle reported that the flight and handling characteristics of the operational orbiters were similar to those of Enterprise, except that he had to fly a steeper profile with the prototype, as it was much lighter than the operational spacecraft.

Ferry flights
Following the free-flight tests, Enterprise was prepared for ferry flight tests, which were intended to ensure that the SCA/orbiter configuration was viable for flights of the duration between landing and launch sites.

List of ALT flights

After ALT

Following the end of the flight test program, Enterprise was taken for testing with the external tank and SRBs in full-up launch configuration, to test both the structural responses of the "stack" itself and the launch procedures prior to the entry into service and first launch of the first operational orbiter. These tests first saw Enterprise taken to the Dynamic Structural Test Facility, located at the Marshall Space Flight Center in Huntsville, Alabama, where the complete stack was subjected to vertical ground vibration tests, assessing the structural responses to a number of scenarios. Then, the orbiter was flown to the Kennedy Space Center in Florida, to test the procedures of assembling the stack in the Vehicle Assembly Building, transporting it from the VAB to the launch pad, and to fit check the facilities and procedures at LC-39 to be used in launching the Shuttle.

Video gallery

Notes

References 

Space Shuttle missions
Edwards Air Force Base
1977 in the United States
Articles containing video clips
1977 in aviation
Fred Haise